The 43rd Regiment Illinois Volunteer Infantry, known as the "Koerner Regiment" after Gustav Körner, was an infantry regiment that served in the Union Army during the American Civil War.

Service
The 43rd  Illinois Infantry was organized at Camp Butler, Illinois and mustered into Federal service on October 12, 1861.

The regiment was mustered out on November 30, 1865.

Total strength and casualties
The regiment suffered 8 officers and 75 enlisted men who were killed in action or mortally wounded and 2 officers and 161 enlisted men who died of disease, for a total of 246 fatalities.

Commanders
Colonel Julius Raith - Mortally wounded at Shiloh, died on April 9, 1862.
Colonel Adolph Englemann - Mustered out on December 31, 1864.
Lieutenant Colonel Adolph Dengler  -  mustered out with the regiment.

See also
List of Illinois Civil War Units
Illinois in the American Civil War

Notes

References
The Civil War Archive

Units and formations of the Union Army from Illinois
1861 establishments in Illinois
Military units and formations established in 1861
Military units and formations disestablished in 1865